Mariano Aguilar (born 13 April 1971 in Spain) is a Spanish retired footballer.

References

Association football defenders
Spanish footballers
Living people
1971 births
Atlético Madrid B players
CA Marbella footballers
CD Leganés players
Getafe CF footballers
Racing de Ferrol footballers
CF Fuenlabrada footballers
Cádiz CF players